Narendran Makan Jayakanthan Vaka is a 2001 Indian Malayalam-language satirical film directed by Sathyan Anthikkad and written by Sreenivasan. The film stars Kunchacko Boban and Samyuktha Varma. The story follows Jayakanthan (Kunchacko Boban), who comes from Kumbakonam, to his late father's village in Paruthippara, Kannur district, to claim his father's property. The film marks the acting debut of  Asin, however this remained her first and only Malayalam film to date. The film released on 24 August 2001 coinciding with the festival of Onam.

Plot
The story is about Jayakanthan, who comes to claim his father Narendran's property in their native village. There he meets Vinodini, who is the panchayat president and a strict follower of the rules. Swathi is Jayakanthan's cousin and her father Balakrishnan Nambiar is worried that Jayakanthan, his nephew, has come to marry her and inherit their property. Bhargavan has usurped Narendran's land, but Jayakanthan is unaware of this and becomes his good friend. The remainder of the plot is about how things fall into place.

Cast

 Kunchacko Boban as Jayakanthan
 Samyuktha Varma as Panchayath President Vinodhini
 Asin as Swathi
 Parthiban as Devasahayam
 Sreenivasan as Bhargavan
 KPAC Lalitha as Kunjulakshmi
 Janardhanan as Balakrishnan Nambiar
 Innocent as Johny Vellikkala
 Cochin Haneefa as Kittunni
 Oduvil Unnikrishnan as "Naxal" Vasu
 Mamukkoya as Nambeesan
 Sukumari as Aishumma
 Bindu Panicker as Soudamini 
 Vettukili Prakash
 Kulappulli Leela as Sharada
 Remya Nambeeshan as Sethulekshmi, Jayankanthan's sister
 Monilal As Panchyath Secretary
 Rajan Padur as Bomb Maker

Soundtrack

The film features songs composed by Johnson and written by Mullanezhi.

References

External links
 

2001 films
Films scored by Johnson
2001 comedy films
Indian satirical films
Indian comedy films
2000s Malayalam-language films
Films shot in Kannur
Films shot in Palakkad
Films directed by Sathyan Anthikad
Films with screenplays by Sreenivasan
2000s satirical films